

France
 French Somaliland – 
 René Tirant, Governor of French Somaliland (1962–1966)
 Louis Saget, Governor of French Somaliland (1966–1967)

Portugal
 Angola – 
 Silvino Silvério Marquês, High Commissioner of Angola (1962–1966)
 Camilo Augusto de Miranda Rebocho Vaz, High Commissioner of Angola (1966–1972)

United Kingdom
 Federation of South Arabia 
 Governor – Sir Richard Gordon Turnbull, High Commissioner of South Arabia (1964–1967)
 Minister – 
 Ali Musa al-Babakr, Chief Minister of South Arabia (1965–1966)
 Salih al-Awadli, Chief Minister of South Arabia (1966–1967)

Colonial governors
Colonial governors
1966